Angus Hudson is a fictional character from the ITV drama Upstairs, Downstairs, portrayed by actor Gordon Jackson from 1971 until 1975.

Biography
Hudson was the authoritarian Scottish butler of the Bellamy household at 165 Eaton Place, Belgravia, London. Hudson was a featured character in sixty episodes from 1971 until 1975 (1903—1930 in the series' timeline; although it was later established that both Hudson and Mrs Kate Bridges the cook had served the Bellamys since the late 1870s or early 1880s, being there before the subsequent births of both James Bellamy and Elizabeth Bellamy). Upon the death of Lady Marjorie, he reminisces as being a 'young footman' on her family's estate. There is also reference to Mrs Bridges' being there at the same time. However, in one of the earlier episodes when Mrs Bridges is taken to court, Hudson states from the witness box that he has known Mrs Bridges for twelve years; given that the Bellamy children are aged around 24 and 17 in that episode, this casts some doubt. Hudson giving character evidence in court assures the court that he will ensure that Mrs Bridges receives the guidance and support she needs in future and that he will marry Mrs Bridges when they leave service to provide her with security and peace of mind: the judge has to cut him off as he is so ardent. Hudson's younger brother, Donald is a relatively famous civil engineer, having constructed two major bridges over the Zambezi river: it appears that Hudson has gone to some effort to assist his brother's education in the past.

Personality
Hudson was a well-educated man from a working-class background; and although somewhat bigoted in some of his attitudes (particularly towards Germans--perhaps understandable with the onset of WWI), he was essentially a fair and good-hearted man. He displays, on occasions, a sense of humour and could be seen joking with the other staff. A Chelsea fan, he would sometimes discuss football matches with Edward, the footman. He felt a keen responsibility in maintaining the standards of service in an aristocratic household. His talents lay in the organisation of the staff, his theological knowledge, and also his fine handwriting, considered to be a great art, as demonstrated each Christmas when sending cards to friends and his brother in Scotland. He was depicted as an exemplary butler (although he was shown eavesdropping on phone calls), and his loyalty towards the Bellamy Family was without question. He tells Edward that being a butler is a "sacred trust." This was just as well, for the Bellamy Family had a number of shocking (by early twentieth century standards) secrets.

As butler, and because there was no housekeeper to supervise the female staff, he was head of all the Servant Staff, which was initially Mrs. Bridges (whom he married in the final episode of the series), Irish kitchen maid Emily, eccentric footman Alfred Harris, pragmatic head house parlour-maid (and later lady's maid) Rose Buck, mischievous under house parlour-maid Sarah Moffat, coachman Pearce and Lady Marjorie's lady's maid Maude Roberts. Later servants to come under his authority (and his stern affection) include replacement footman Edward Barnes, replacement parlour-maid Daisy Peel/Barnes and replacement kitchen maid Ruby Finch.

Awards
Gordon Jackson, who portrayed Hudson, won the British Actor of the Year Award in 1974 and an Emmy Award for Outstanding Single Performance by a Supporting Actor in 1975 for the episode "The Beastly Hun".

References

Fictional butlers
Upstairs, Downstairs characters
Fictional Scottish people